Dyschirius zimini is a species of ground beetle in the subfamily Scaritinae. It was described by Znojko in 1928.

References

zimini
Beetles described in 1928